Sumbawa is an Indonesian island, located in the middle of the Lesser Sunda Islands chain, with Lombok to the west, Flores to the east, and Sumba further to the southeast. Along with Lombok, it forms the province of West Nusa Tenggara, but there have been plans by the Indonesian government to split the island off into a separate province. Traditionally, the island is known as the source of sappanwood, as well as honey and sandalwood. Its savanna-like climate and vast grasslands are used to breed horses and cattle, as well as to hunt deer.
 
It marks the boundary between the islands to the west, which were influenced by religion and culture spreading from India, and the region to the east that was less influenced. In particular this applies to both Hinduism and Islam.

Etymology
Sumbawa is a Portuguese corruption of the locally used name Sambawa (still found as such in Makassarese, cf. also Semawa in the Sumbawa language). This name is probably derived from Sanskrit śāmbhawa (शम्भु), meaning 'related to Śambhu (= 'the Benevolent', a name for Shiva)'.

History
The 14th-century Nagarakretagama mentioned several principalities identified to be on Sumbawa; Dompu, Bima, Sape and one on the Sang Hyang Api island just off the coast of northeast Sumbawa. Four principalities in western Sumbawa were dependencies of the Majapahit Empire of eastern Java. Because of Sumbawa's natural resources, it was regularly invaded by outside forces – from the Javanese, Balinese, Makassar, to the Dutch and Japanese. The Dutch first arrived in 1605, but did not effectively rule Sumbawa until the early 20th century.

For a short period of time, the Balinese kingdom of Gelgel ruled a part of western Sumbawa. The eastern parts of the island, on the other hand, were home to the Sultanate of Bima, an Islamic polity that had links to the Bugis and Makassar peoples of South Sulawesi, as well as other Malay-Islamic polities in the archipelago.

Historical evidence indicates that people on Sumbawa island were known in the East Indies for their honey, horses, sappanwood, which is used to make red dye, and sandalwood, which is used for incense and medications. The area was thought to be highly productive agriculturally. In the 18th century, the Dutch introduced coffee plantation on the western slopes of Mount Tambora, a volcano on the north side of Sumbawa, thus creating the Tambora coffee variant.

Tambora's colossal eruption in 1815 was the most powerful in recorded history, ejecting  of ash and debris into the atmosphere. The eruption killed up to 71,000 people and triggered a period of global cooling known as the "Year Without a Summer" in 1816.  It also apparently destroyed a small culture of Papuan affinity, known to archaeologists as the "Tambora culture".

Administration
Sumbawa is administratively divided into four regencies (kabupaten) and one kota (city).  They are:

The Indonesian Government is currently considering the division of Nusu Tenggara Barat Province to create a separate Sumbawa Island province. There is no information as to whether the remaining part of the present province (i.e. the districts comprising Lombok Island) would then be renamed.

Demographics 
Islam, the dominant faith of the island, was introduced by the Makassarese of Sulawesi.

Sumbawa had, historically speaking, three major linguistic groups who spoke languages that were unintelligible to each other. One group centered in the western side of the island speaks Basa Semawa (Indonesian: Bahasa Sumbawa) which is similar to the Sasak language from nearby Lombok; the second group in the east speaks Nggahi Mbojo (Bahasa Bima). They were once separated by the Tambora culture, which spoke a language related to neither. After the demise of Tambora due to the 1815 eruption, local kingdoms based in Sumbawa Besar and Bima became the two focal points of Sumbawa. This division of the island into two parts remains today; Sumbawa Besar and Bima are the two largest towns on the island, and are the centers of distinct cultural groups that share the island.

The population of the island (including minor outlying islands) was 1.56 million at the latest decennial census in 2020, comprising 29.46% of the population of the entire Province of West Nusa Tenggara's 5.32 million people. Due to lack of work opportunities on the island and its frequent droughts, many people on the island seek work in the Middle East as laborers or domestic servants; some 500,000 workers, or over 10% of the population of West Nusa Tenggara, have left the country to work overseas.

Geography

The island is bounded by bodies of water; to the west is Alas Strait, south is the Indian Ocean, Saleh Bay creates a major north-central indentation in the island, and the Flores Sea runs the length of the northern coastline.  The Sape Strait lies to the east of the island and separates Sumbawa from Flores and the Komodo Islands, there are a number bays and gulfs, most notably Bima Bay, Cempi Bay, and Waworada Bay.

Sumbawa's most distinguishing features are Saleh Bay and the Sanggar Peninsula.  On the latter stands Mount Tambora (8°14’41”S, 117°59’35”E), a large stratovolcano famous for its VEI 7 eruption in 1815, one of only a few eruptions of such magnitude in the last 2,000 years.  The eruption obliterated most of Tambora's summit, reducing its height by about a third and leaving a six kilometer-wide caldera.  Regardless, Tambora remains the highest point on the island.  Highlands rise in four spots on the island, as well as on Sangeang Island.  The large western lobe of Sumbawa is dominated by a large central highland, and Tambora, Dompu and Bima each have more minor highlands.

There are a number of large surrounding islands, most notably are Moyo Island, volcanically active Sangeang Island, and the tourist Komodo Islands (administered under Flores) to the east.

Sumbawa is part of the Lesser Sundas deciduous forests ecoregion.

List of offshore islands

There are a number of smaller offshore islands which fall within the regencies based on Sumbawa Island:

 West Sumbawa Regency
 Susait
 Dua
 Belang
 Songi
 Ular
 Kenawa
 Natano

 Sumbawa Besar Regency
 Panjang Island
 Saringi
 Kemudang
 Ayer Tawat
 Romo
 Medang Island

 Saleh Bay, Sumbawa Besar Regency
 Moyo Island
 Dangar Besar
 Liang
 Ngali
 Tengar
 Kelapang
 Dompo
 Takebo
 Paming
 Lipa
 Rakit

 Dompu Regency
 P. Besar
 P. Nisa Pudu
 P. Nisa Rate
 Bima Regency, Tambora Peninsula exclave
 Satonda Island
 Bima Regency
 Sangeang Island
 Sanai Island
 Matagate Island
 Banta Island

Economy

Many of the island residents are at risk of starvation when crops fail due to lack of rainfall.  The majority of the population works in agriculture. Tourism is just beginning, with a few surf spots renowned for being world class, Jelenga and Supersuck Beaches  near the mine, as well as Hu'u and Lakey Beach  in the Gulf of Cempi.

Newmont Mine
A large gold and copper mine,  Newmont Mining Corporation's Batu Hijau mine began commercial operations in 2000, a decade after the copper and gold were discovered.   Newmont holds a 45% stake in the operation through its shareholding in PT Newmont Nusa Tenggara.  A local unit of Japan's Sumitomo Corporation has a 35% share. The mine is located in southwest Sumbawa.

Due to the mine, Sumbawa Barat Regency  along with other remote mining towns, and Jakarta, have the highest GDP per capita rates in Indonesia, Sumbawa Barat's is 156.25 million rupiah (US$17,170) ,  Newmont and its partners have invested about $1.9 billion in the mine.  The reserves are expected to last until 2034, making Batu Hijau one of the largest copper mines in the world.

Transport
There is a road network in Sumbawa, but it is poorly maintained and has long portions of rough gravel.  Frequent ferry service to Sumbawa (Poto Tano) from Lombok (Labuhan Lombok) exists; however, the ferry service to Flores from Sape is infrequent.  Bima is the largest city on Sumbawa and has ferry and bus services directly to Java and Bali, though service breakdowns are common.

The most convenient way to reach Sumbawa is via air. There are commercial flights connecting the island's main airport, the Bima airport, to Denpasar and Makassar.

References

External links

Sumbawa Tourist Attraction
West Nusa Tenggara
Hägerdal, Hans (2017), Held's History of Sumbawa. Amsterdam: Amsterdam University Press.

 
Lesser Sunda Islands
Landforms of West Nusa Tenggara
Islands of Indonesia
 
Islands of the Indian Ocean
Populated places in Indonesia